Irfan Jašarević (born 24 August 1995) is a Bosnian professional footballer who plays as a left-back for Bosnian Premier League club Željezničar.

Career statistics

Club

References

External links

Irfan Jašarević at Sofascore

1995 births
Living people
People from Vitez
Association football fullbacks
Bosnia and Herzegovina footballers
NK Travnik players
FK Krupa players
Dalkurd FF players
BK Olympic players
FK Željezničar Sarajevo players
Premier League of Bosnia and Herzegovina players
Allsvenskan players
Superettan players
Ettan Fotboll players
Bosnia and Herzegovina expatriate footballers
Expatriate footballers in Sweden
Bosnia and Herzegovina expatriate sportspeople in Sweden